Viola maviensis, commonly known as the Hawai'i bog violet, a species of woody-stemmed violet endemic to Hawaii, United States.

Range
Viola maviensis is endemic to the islands of Maui, Molokai, and Hawaii in the United States.

Habitat
Viola maviensis occurs in open bogs, or rarely bog margins, at elevations of 1220–2010 m (~4000–6600 ft).

References

Endemic flora of Hawaii
maviensis
Flora without expected TNC conservation status